Carmen is one of the 11 municipalities that make up the Mexican state of Campeche. It is situated at the south-west of the state, on and around the Laguna de Términos. The municipal seat and largest settlement is Ciudad del Carmen. As of 2015, the population was 248,303.

The name "Carmen" is in honour of 16 July, the feast of Nuestra Señora del Carmen, after the date in 1717 when Spanish colonial authorities finally expelled the pirates from the island now known as Isla del Carmen.

History and geography
The municipality of Carmen borders to the north with the Gulf of Mexico; to the west with the municipality of Palizada; and to the east with the municipalities of Champotón, Escárcega and Candelaria. It covers a total surface area of  9,720.09 km².

Demographics
As of 2010, the municipality had a total population of 221,094.

The municipality had 1,886 localities, the largest of which (with 2010 populations in parentheses) were: Ciudad del Carmen (169,466), Sabancuy (7,286), Isla Aguada (6,204), Nuevo Progreso (4,851), San Antonio Cárdenas (4,206), Atasta (2,535), classified as urban, and Checubul (1,811), Chicbul (1,692), Colonia Emiliano Zapata (1,311), El Aguacatal (1,270), Mamantel (Pancho Villa) (1,262), Licenciado Gustavo Díaz Ordaz (18 de Marzo) (1,239), and Abelardo L. Rodríguez (1,130), classified as rural.

The 2005 census reported a population of 199,988 persons. Of these, 4,151 spoke one of 25 indigenous languages used in the municipality, predominantly Ch'ol and Yucatec Maya.

References

Link to tables of population data from Census of 2005 INEGI: Instituto Nacional de Estadística, Geografía e Informática
Carmen  Enciclopedia de los Municipios de México

External links
Ayuntamiento de Carmen Official website 
Municipio de Carmen from official Campeche state government website 

Municipalities of Campeche